The National Film School of Ireland is part of the Dún Laoghaire Institute of Art, Design and Technology, in its Faculty of Film, Art and Creative Technologies. Launched in 2003, it acts as a "centre of excellence" for film, animation, broadcasting and digital media. The School offers the only BA Honours in Film and Television Production in the country, although the Huston School in Galway, Galway-Mayo Institute of Technology and Ballyfermot College of Further Education in Dublin do offer diplomas in film-related studies.  

Notable visiting lecturers include Jim Sheridan, Oliver Stone, John Boorman, Neil Jordan, Stephen Frears, Stephen Rea and John Landis.

References

Dún Laoghaire
Universities and colleges in the Republic of Ireland
Institutes of technology in the Republic of Ireland
Art schools in Ireland
Education in Dún Laoghaire–Rathdown
Film schools